Orbel Peak is the rocky peak of elevation 784 m forming the north extremity of Lisiya Ridge on Magnier Peninsula, Graham Coast in Graham Land, Antarctica. It has steep and partly ice-free southeast and west slopes, and surmounts Muldava Glacier to the southwest and Leroux Bay to the north. Orbel is the ancient Thracian name of a group of mountains in Southwestern Bulgaria.

Location
British mapping in 1971.

Maps
 Antarctic Digital Database (ADD). Scale 1:250000 topographic map of Antarctica. Scientific Committee on Antarctic Research (SCAR). Since 1993, regularly upgraded and updated.
British Antarctic Territory. Scale 1:200000 topographic map. DOS 610 Series, Sheet W 65 64. Directorate of Overseas Surveys, Tolworth, UK, 1971.

Notes

References
 Bulgarian Antarctic Gazetteer. Antarctic Place-names Commission. (details in Bulgarian, basic data in English)
Orbel Peak. SCAR Composite Antarctic Gazetteer.

External links
 Orbel Peak. Copernix satellite image

Mountains of Graham Land
Bulgaria and the Antarctic
Graham Coast